Kyrgyzstan has few cities but a large number of villages spread across the country's 7 regions and many districts. Below is a list of villages of Kyrtgyzstan as well as the regions in which they are found.

Villages

Kyrgyzstan
Villages